Vin Gupta is an American pulmonologist who is a medical analyst for NBC News and MSNBC. He also serves as a senior principal scientist with Amazon, affiliate professor with the University of Washington's Institute for Health Metrics and Evaluation, attending physician at Virginia Mason Medical Center, and lead officer of the Critical Care Air Transport Team for the United States Air Force Medical Service Reserves, based at Joint Base Lewis–McChord.

Career

Education and medical career 
Gupta attended Princeton University, where he received a Bachelor of Arts degree in 2005. He received his Doctor of Medicine degree from the Columbia University Vagelos College of Physicians and Surgeons in 2011, and completed his residency in internal medicine at University of Washington.

He did a fellowship in Pulmonary & Critical Care Medicine at Brigham and Women's Hospital in Boston from 2014 to 2017. As part of the United States Air Force Medical Service Reserves, he completed commissioned officer training in 2015. He also got his Master of Studies in International Relations from the University of Cambridge  in 2015, and a Master of Public Administration from Harvard Kennedy School at Harvard in 2017.

In 2018, Gupta moved back to the Seattle area to work with the University of Washington Medical Center and the Swedish Medical Center. In January 2020, Gupta joined Amazon where he later served as the company's chief medical officer for COVID-19 response and is currently a senior principal in their Devices and Services group. Also in 2020, he left Swedish Medical and joined the Virginia Mason Medical Center; he remains an affiliate faculty member at the Institute for Health Metrics and Evaluation and Evans School; both organizations are part of the University of Washington in Seattle.

Media contributor and other ventures 
Since 2020, Gupta has worked as a high-profile medical analyst for NBC media, serving as an NBC News and MSNBC medical contributor on issues related to the COVID-19 pandemic and other public health issues. According to The Seattle Times, he made "hundreds" of appearances in 2020 alone to provide medical guidance to the public. Prior to the pandemic, Gupta has spoken and written on a range of public health issues, including climate change, vaping, and gun violence.

Gupta serves on the Board of Directors of the Center for Environmental Health and Northwest Harvest. He is also a Term Member of the Council on Foreign Relations.

In July 2022, Politico first reported that Gupta was the leading candidate for a top role within the Biden administration, specifically as Principal Medical Advisor to the US Food and Drug Administration. In this role, Gupta would "be charged primarily with improving the FDA’s image and boosting public trust in the agency as a public health authority." This follows prior speculation that Gupta was short-listed for United States Surgeon General by President Biden shortly after the latter's election in 2020, amid other reporting that he was under consideration. The US Military magazine Reserve+National Guard described Gupta in their 2022 profile as "(he) might be America's next most widely recognized medical expert on the pandemic" after Anthony Fauci.

References 

Living people
Year of birth missing (living people)
Alumni of the University of Cambridge
American pulmonologists
Columbia University Vagelos College of Physicians and Surgeons alumni
Harvard Kennedy School alumni
Princeton University alumni
Physicians from Seattle
21st-century American physicians
Amazon (company) people
American broadcast news analysts